Lise Zarac (born August 22, 1950 in Montreal, Quebec) is a Canadian politician, currently sitting on the Montreal City Council.

She represented the federal electoral district of LaSalle—Émard, Quebec from 2008 until 2011 as a member of the Liberal Party. She was defeated by Hélène LeBlanc of the NDP in 2011.

In 2017 she turned to municipal politics, and was elected to represent the district of Cecil-P.-Newman in LaSalle on Montreal City Council as part of the local LaSalle party Équipe Barbe Team.

References

External links
Profile from the Liberal Party of Canada

1950 births
Women members of the House of Commons of Canada
Liberal Party of Canada MPs
Living people
Members of the House of Commons of Canada from Quebec
People from LaSalle, Quebec
Women in Quebec politics
21st-century Canadian politicians
21st-century Canadian women politicians
Montreal city councillors
Women municipal councillors in Canada